The Rocco A. Petrone Launch Control Center (commonly known as just the Launch Control Center or LCC) is a four-story building at NASA's Kennedy Space Center on Merritt Island, Florida, used to manage launches of launch vehicles from Kennedy Space Center Launch Complex 39. Attached to the southeast corner of the Vehicle Assembly Building, the LCC contains offices; telemetry, tracking, and instrumentation equipment; and firing rooms.

LCC has conducted launches since the unmanned Apollo 4 (Apollo-Saturn 501) launch on November 9, 1967. LCC's first launch with a human crew was Apollo 8 on December 21, 1968. NASA's Space Shuttle program also used LCC. NASA has renovated the center for  Space Launch System (SLS) missions, which began in 2022 with Artemis 1. In February 2022, the center was renamed after former launch director Rocco A. Petrone.

Firing rooms

Launch operations are supervised and controlled from several control rooms  known as firing rooms. The controllers are in control of pre-launch checks, the booster and spacecraft. Once the rocket has cleared the launch tower (usually within the first 10–15 seconds), is when control is switched over to the mission's relative mission control center. (The Christopher C. Kraft Jr. Mission Control Center at the Johnson Space Center in Houston, Texas for NASA launches or SpaceX Mission Control Center in Hawthorne, California for SpaceX launches.)

Extensive renovation of Firing Room 4 was finished in 2006.

Firing Room 4 is leased by SpaceX and serves as their launch control center for Launch Complex 39A.

Key personnel

Launch Director (LD)

The Launch Director is the head of the launch team, and is responsible for making the final "go" or "no go" decision for launch after polling the relevant team members. There have been eight different Space Shuttle launch directors between 1981 and 2011.

Flow Director (FD)

The Flow Director is responsible for the preparation of the spacecraft for launch, and remains in the LCC in an advisory capacity.

NASA Test Director (NTD)

The NASA Test Director is responsible for all pre-launch testing, whether involving the flight crew, the orbiter, the external tank/solid rocket booster, or ground support equipment. The NTD is also responsible for the safety of all personnel on the pad after fuelling has occurred. Reports to the Launch Director.

Orbiter Test Conductor (OTC)

The Orbiter Test Conductor is in charge of all pre-flight checkout and testing of the orbiter, and manages the engineers in the firing room who monitor the orbiter's systems. OTC is an employee of a contractor rather than of NASA.

Tank/Booster Test Conductor (TBC)

Payload Test Conductor (PTC)

The Payload Test Conductor is responsible for the pre-flight test and checkout of payloads carried by the orbiter and manages the engineering and test teams responsible for monitoring and controlling payload ground operations. PTC is a contractor member of the Space Shuttle Team.

Launch Processing System Coordinator (LPS)

The LPS Coordinator monitors and oversees the LPS System; specifically, the desired launch rate, Space Shuttle stacking (assembly), and all safety requirements. This is made possible by the Launch Processing System, or LPS — a highly automated, computer-controlled system that oversees the entire checkout and launch process.

Support Test Manager (STM)

Safety Console Coordinator (SAFETY)

Shuttle Project Engineer (SPE)

Landing and Recovery Director (LRD)

No Landing and Recovery Director (NLRD)

Superintendent of Range Operations (SRO)

The Superintendent of Range Operations ensures that all tracking and communications systems are ready to support the launch operation as well as ensuring that downrange airspace and splashdown areas remain clear for launch, and monitors weather near the launch site.

Ground Launch Sequencer Engineer (CGLS)

The Ground Launch Sequencer Engineer is responsible for monitoring the operation of the automated Ground Launch Sequencer system, which controls the countdown from T-9 minutes until launch. After this point through to T-31 seconds, they are in charge of implementing a manual hold if necessary. After T-31 seconds only an automatic cutoff is available. The automatic cutoff recycles the countdown clock to T-20 minutes. Usually this will extend the launch time beyond the launch window causing a scrub and a 24-hour turnaround.

Gallery

See also
Ground station
Launch status check
Mission control center
Spacecraft naming

References

Sources
Launch Control Center
Launch Control Center Main page.
Launch Team

External links

 History of the Firing Rooms at the Launch Control Center
 Floor plan layout of the Firing Rooms at the Launch Control Center
New Launch Control Room Ready for STS-121 Liftoff
KSC Launch Processing System

Kennedy Space Center
Buildings and structures in Merritt Island, Florida
National Register of Historic Places in Brevard County, Florida